The People's Party of Dominica (P-POD) is a political party in the Commonwealth of Dominica.

Background
P-POD is a political party in the Commonwealth of Dominica. It was founded on November 3, 2015 by Sapphire Carrington. On the political spectrum the party is positioned as Centre-Right. It did not contest either the 2019 Dominican general election or 2022 Dominican general election.

P-POD has previously advocated for youth development by conducting grassroots organizing efforts, educational activities, and electoral campaigns throughout the island.

History

This political movement began in summer 2015. P-POD grew out of simple discussions about the current state and direction of Dominica, forming a new political party. The policy platform of the People's Party of Dominica outlines their positions on a variety of issues and the actions its leadership will take to implement them once elected. P-POD promotes equity, participation, pluralism, transparency, accountability, and the rule of law.

Structure and composition

The People's Party has two local committees:

 The People's National Committee (PNC). The PNC motto is "Progress is Everyone's Business". The PNC is composed of nominated members in every village in Dominica and the Diaspora. Three Co-chairs, a Secretary, and a Treasurer oversee daily operations of this committee. The PNC conducts most of its business virtually. It is scheduled to begin holding National Meetings to conduct business in person quarterly at strategic locations on the island.
 The Orange Parliamentarians Campaign Committee (OPCC). Their tagline is "Building Momentum Moving Forward". The OPCC provides a platform to inspire positive action and to help the people of Dominica live their dream. The OPCC does this by taking economic action, having sustainable goals, using proven systems, and creating deep-rooted policies.

Geographic distribution

P-POD has its strongest popular support throughout the Roseau constituency and Mahaut constituency, with small pockets throughout the island. P-POD's caucus is composed mostly of progressives and centrists.

Caucuses

 Northern Caucus
 Eastern Caucus
 Southern Caucus
 Western Caucus
 Kalinago Caucus
 Disability Caucus
 Youth Caucus
 Silver Caucus
 Diaspora Caucus
 Ladies Caucus
 Gentlemen Caucus
 Entrepreneurs Caucus

References

Political parties in Dominica
Political parties established in 2015